Pierre Le Grand was a French buccaneer supposedly active during the 17th century. He is known to history from only one source, Alexandre Exquemelin's Buccaneers of America, and thus his historical existence has been questioned.

Origins
Pierre was born in Dieppe, France. Nothing is known of his life before his arrival in Tortuga at some time in the mid-17th century.

Attack on Spanish galleon
Pierre le Grand is known only for his attack on a Spanish galleon near the coast of Hispaniola in the 17th century. The exact site of the attack is uncertain; Exquemelin at one point says the Caicos Islands were the scene of the crime, and at another point places the attack at Cape Tiburón, off the southwest coast of Hispaniola.

Pierre had recruited a crew of 28 men on a single small boat and sailed in search of Spanish ships to rob. After a long, fruitless cruise, his buccaneer band spotted a ship, a straggler from the Spanish treasure fleet. They voted to pursue it, and shortly after sunset, they drew alongside their prey without being seen.

The legend says that Pierre ordered the crew's surgeon to cut a hole in the side of their own boat and sink it, to inspire the men to fight their hardest for lack of a means of retreat. Then the pirates climbed up the side of the galleon, armed with swords and pistols.

Surprise was complete. The pirates took the galleon's captain unawares while he played cards in his own cabin. Pierre's men also seized the gun room, slaughtering the Spanish guards and preventing the rest of the Spanish crew from obtaining weapons to defend themselves and their ship. The galleon's sailors had little choice but to surrender.

Pierre Le Grand then forced some of the Spanish crew into his service, set the rest ashore (presumably on Hispaniola), and took his captured ship and his men to France. He then disappears from history. However, there is some indication that he may have emigrated to Canada, as his name appears in the immigration records as arriving in Montreal in 1653.

References
Alexandre Exquemelin, The Buccaneers of America, 1684. Chapter V.
Massicotte, Edouard Z. "Les Colons de Montreal de 1642 a 1667." p. 224

17th-century births
17th-century pirates
French emigrants to Canada
French pirates
History of Hispaniola
People of Saint-Domingue
People whose existence is disputed
Year of death unknown